The Diocese of Northern Malawi is one of the four diocese in Malawi within the Church of the Province of Central Africa: the current bishop is  Fanuel Magangani.

References

Anglicanism in Malawi
Northern Malawi